In common law, possession proceedings are proceedings in a court of law due to a dispute over possession of a physical asset. These are common in divorce issues where the parties cannot decide on which of the two will receive possession of a particular object of value.

Common law legal terminology
Property law legal terminology
Family law legal terminology
Judicial legal terminology